The 2012 Sligo Rovers F.C. season was the club's 68th season competing in the League of Ireland and the team's first season under the management of Ian Baraclough. It was the team's seventh consecutive season in the Premier Division. Sligo Rovers won their first title in 35 years.

Squad

Transfers

In

Out

Squad statistics

Appearances, goals and cards
Last Updated – 30 October 2012

Top scorers
Includes all competitive matches. The list is sorted by shirt number when total goals are equal.
Last updated 22 October 2012

Top Assists
Includes all competitive matches. The list is sorted by shirt number when total assists are equal.
Last updated 22 October 2012

Disciplinary record

Technical staff
Manager: Ian Baraclough
Assistant Manager: Gerry Carr
Coach: Maurice Monaghan

Competitions

League of Ireland

League table

Results summary

Results by round

Matches

FAI Cup

Third round

Setanta Cup

quarter-final 

Sligo Rovers won 3–1 on aggregate

semi-final 

Sligo Rovers lost 3–2 on aggregate

EA Sports Cup

Second round

quarter-final

semi-final

Europa League

2nd qualifying round 

Sligo Rovers lost 4–2 on aggregate

Preseason friendlies

Records

Overall
{|class="wikitable" style="text-align: center;"
|-
!
!Total
!Home 
!Away
|-
|align=left| Games played          || 40 || 22 || 18
|-
|align=left| Games won             || 21 || 15 || 6 
|-
|align=left| Games drawn           || 12 || 5 || 7 
|-
|align=left| Games lost            || 7 || 1 || 6
|-
|align=left| Biggest win           || 4–0 vs Derry City || 4–0 vs Derry City|| 3–1 vs Drogheda United & Shelbourne 
|-
|align=left| Biggest loss         || 0–2 vs Crusaders & Shamrock Rovers & 1–3 vs Monaghan United & 1–3 vs Spartak Trnava || 1–3 vs Monaghan United & 0–2 Shamrock Rovers || 0–2 vs Crusaders  & 1–3 vs Spartak Trnava 
|-
|align=left| Biggest win (League)  || 3–0 vs Dundalk & Shamrock Rovers & Shelbourne & Dundalk & 4–1 vs Drogheda United & Derry City || 3–0 vs Dundalk & Shamrock Rovers & Shelbourne & Dundalk & 4–1 vs Drogheda United & Derry City|| 3–1 vs Drogheda United & Shelbourne
|-
|align=left| Biggest win (Cup)     || 4–0 vs Derry City  || 4–0 vs Derry City ||
|-
|align=left| Biggest loss (League) || 0–2 vs Shamrock Rovers || 0–2 vs Shamrock Rovers  || 0–1 vs UCD & 1–2 vs Drogheda United
|-
|align=left| Biggest loss (Cup)      || 0–2 vs Crusaders &  1–3 vs Monaghan United & 1–3 vs Spartak Trnava  ||   1–3 vs Monaghan United || 0–2 vs Crusaders & 1–3 vs Spartak Trnava 
|-
|align=left| Biggest loss (Europe) || 1–3 vs Spartak Trnava  || || 1–3 vs Spartak Trnava 
|-
|align=left| Clean sheets          || 13 || 8 || 5 
|-
|align=left| Goals scored          || 69 || 50 || 19 
|-
|align=left| Goals conceded        || 36 || 19 || 17 
|-
|align=left| Goal difference       || +33 || +31 || +2  
|-
|align=left| Consecutive Victories       || 4 || 5 || 2 
|-
|align=left| Unbeaten run       || 10 || 10 || 4 
|-
|align=left| Consecutive Defeats       || 2 || 1 ||  2
|-
|align=left| Winless Run       || 3 || 3 || 3 
|-
|-
|-
|align=left| Yellow cards         || 64 || 28 || 36 
|-
|align=left| Red cards            || 5 || 3 || 2 
|-
|align=left| Most appearances     ||  Gavin Peers & Lee Lynch & Ross Gaynor (36) || colspan=2|–
|-
|align=left| Most minutes played  ||  Gary Rogers(3,150) || colspan=2|–
|-
|align=left| Top scorer           ||  Danny North (17)
|-
|align=left| Top assists           ||   Ross Gaynor(11) || colspan=2|–
|-
|align=left| Points               || 61/90 (%) || 37/48 (%) || 24/42 (%) 
|-
|align=left| Winning rate         || % || % || % 
|-

References

External links
Sligo Rovers FC Website
The Showgrounds home of Sligo Rovers FC
Sligo Rovers Supporters Forum
2012 Sligo Rovers F.C. season at Soccerway

2011
Sligo Rovers

ca:Sligo Rovers F.C.
de:Sligo Rovers
es:Sligo Rovers Football Club
fr:Sligo Rovers Football Club
ga:Sligo Rovers Football Club
gv:Sligo Rovers F.C.
gl:Sligo Rovers F.C.
hr:Sligo Rovers F.C.
it:Sligo Rovers Football Club
he:סליגו רוברס
lt:Sligo Rovers FC
hu:Sligo Rovers FC
nl:Sligo Rovers
no:Sligo Rovers FC
pl:Sligo Rovers
pt:Sligo Rovers
ro:Sligo Rovers FC
ru:Слайго Роверс
simple:Sligo Rovers F.C.
sr:ФК Слајго роверс
fi:Sligo Rovers FC
sv:Sligo Rovers FC
tr:Sligo Rovers FC